Mauritia mauritiana, common names the humpback cowry, chocolate cowry, mourning cowry and Mauritius cowry, is a species of tropical sea snail, a cowry, a marine gastropod mollusc in the family Cypraeidae, the cowries.

Description
The dorsum surface of these smooth and shiny shells is generally dark brown, with distinct large yellowish or amber dots. The edges of the dorsum and the base are completely dark brown. The aperture is long and narrow, with several dark brown teeth and clear spacing. In the living cowries the mantle is completely black, without sensorial papillae.

Distribution
 This is an Indo-Pacific species (see range map) occurring  in the Indian Ocean along South-East Africa and in the western Pacific Ocean (western and northern Australia, Malaysia,  Philippines and Hawaii).

Habitat
This species of cowry is normally restricted to exposed habitats such as wave-washed basalt cliffs or breakwaters.

References

 Schilder, F. A. and Schilder, M. 1938. Prodrome of a monograph on living Cypraeidae. Proc. malac. Soc. Lond. 23: 119-231. page(s): 184
 Verdcourt, B. (1954). The cowries of the East African Coast (Kenya, Tanganyika, Zanzibar and Pemba). Journal of the East Africa Natural History Society 22(4) 96: 129-144, 17 pls.
 Burgess, C.M. (1970). The Living Cowries. AS Barnes and Co, Ltd. Cranbury, New Jersey

External links
 On-line articles with Cypraea mauritiana in the HAWAIIAN SHELL NEWS (1960-1994)
 
 Underwater

Cypraeidae
Gastropods described in 1758
Taxa named by Carl Linnaeus